{{Infobox television
| image                = 2018 Sébastien Rassiat Frédéric molas.png
| caption              = Sébastien Rassiat (left) and Frédéric Molas (right), in 2018
| alt_name             =
| genre                = Physical comedy, satire, video game reviewer
| creator              = Frédéric MolasSébastien Rassiat
| developer            = 
| writer               = Frédéric MolasSébastien RassiatKarim Debbache
| director             = Frédéric MolasSébastien Rassiat
| creative_director    = 
| presenter            = 
| starring             = Frédéric MolasSébastien Rassiat
| judges               = 
| voices               = 
| narrated             = 
| theme_music_composer = Yannick Crémer
| opentheme            = "Musique Générique" by Yannick Crémer
| composer             = 
| country              = France
| language             = French
| num_seasons          = 4
| num_episodes         = "Tests du grenier" : 83"Papy Grenier" : 16"Hors-séries" : 23"Autres" : 11= 133 videos
| executive_producer   = 
| producer             = Frédéric MolasSébastien Rassiat
| editor               = Frédéric MolasSébastien Rassiat
| location             = Perpignan (2009-2012)Fougères (2012-present)
| cinematography       = 
| camera               = Sébastien Rassiat
| runtime              = 10-20 minutes (2012-present)Up to an hour
| company              =
| picture_format       = 
| audio_format         = 
| channel              = YouTubeDailymotionTwitch
| first_aired          = 
| last_aired           = present
| related              = Bazar du Grenier 
}}Le Joueur du Grenier' (literally "The Attic Gamer") is the main character and title of a web television series of farcical retrogaming video reviews created by French filmmakers Frédéric Molas and Sébastien Rassiat in 2009, starring Frédéric Molas and Sébastien Rassiat themselves. Similarly to the Angry Video Game Nerd, which is the direct inspiration for the show, it generally revolves around retro game reviews that involve rants against games of particularly low-quality or poor design.

On September 13, 2012, the channel created a new series called Papy Grenier, where on the contrary, Le Joueur du Grenier talks about good video games for a period of 5 to 8 minutes per episode. They created later the Bazar du Grenier ("The Attic Bazar") channel which is including more diversified videos (including playthroughs or cinema critics). They have more than 3,6 million subscribers on Youtube on their primary channel, and more than 1,8 million on their secondary Bazar channel. Therefore, it is one of the leading French channels on the website. Since 2020, Frédéric Molas also hosts a stream channel on Twitch, named Joueur_du_Grenier, and has accumulated over 700,000 subscribers.

 History 
 Early life of the duo 

Frédéric Molas, born November 26, 1982 in Perpignan, has been passionate about video games since the age of 7, particularly the Mega Drive, his favorite console. After his Baccalauréat, he obtains a certificate of Brevet de technicien supérieur in communication to companies which allows him to continue in a Bachelor's degree on multimedia. He began to take an interest in video by making machinimas (video created from images of video games), while at the same time he was training at the Institute for multimedia development and teaching, where he met Sébastien Rassiat, born October 12, 1982.

Together, they create an association to make institutional videos, working on a voluntary basis for a year, before receiving a small salary. Thinking that their association would last only a few more months, they created the program Le Joueur du Grenier in September 2009 at the start of their unemployment. Inspired by the web show called The Angry Video Game Nerd, its theme is testing video games known for their poor quality or extreme difficulty.

 Joueur du Grenier (2009—present) 
In September 2012, they moved to the city of Fougères, where they settled with other online video producers. In November 2013, the duo joined the NESblog collective, comprising videographers like Realmyop, Cœurdevandale, Usul, Karim Debbache, and many others, who make frequent appearances in their videos.

In March 2012, Frédéric Molas and Sébastien Rassiat created with the videographer Krayn the AFK (Away from keyboard) concept, focused on MMOs, but which ultimately did not succeed. However, the concept returned in a new form in April 2013, under the name LFG - Looking For Games, broadcast as a weekly column on Jeuxvideo.com. In season 1, Fred and Krayn present the aspects of an MMORPG, changing the game every four shows, while Seb presents a word specific to the MMORPG vocabulary at each start of the show. Fred and Seb, on the other hand, are less present in season 2, mainly dealing with MMO news. The show ends in July 2015.

Between May 16 and June 6, 2012, Frédéric Molas and Sébastien Rassiat produced four short humorous presentation videos of the video game Dragon's Dogma, at the request of Capcom.

Frédéric Molas was one of the guests of the fourth edition of the Toulouse Game Show in November 2010, of which he has been a recurring guest ever since, even becoming the headliner of the show in 2019. He was also invited to the JapaNîmes festival in June 2012. He was also present at Retro Game Day 2011. He participates with Sébastien Rassiat since 2011 in Geek Faëries and Japan Expo. He is also present at the Japan Tours Festival which took place at the Vinci, in Tours, from 2015.

In 2019, Frédéric Molas participated in the third edition of the Z Event, a charity event that raised more than 3,500,000 euros to fund research at the Pasteur Institute. He renewed his participation in the 2020 edition, which raised the sum of €5,724,377 for Amnesty International, and then in the 2021 edition, which raised the sum of over €10 million for Action Against Hunger.

 Video series 
 Principle 
The series's title, "Joueur du Grenier", harkens back to the idea of bringing out old archived games. The show exploits the same popular concept as the American counterpart, The Angry Video Game Nerd, namely the review of video games dating from the 1980s, 1990s, and lately 2000s, most often deemed bad.

"The Attic Gamer" is the main character of the series: he performs the tests on his sofa in front of a camera. During the show, he always wears a yellow shirt with green palm trees, which makes him recognizable. In the first episodes, Sébastien does not appear, taking care of the set or making off-screen comments, before playing a large part of the secondary characters in the following episodes. Over time, many YouTubers appear as extras; from local french youtubers like Usul or Antoine Daniel, to featuring American internet comedians like The Nostalgia Critic's Doug Walker and even the Angry Video Game Nerd himself, James Rolfe, for the 11th anniversary episode of the series.

Channel's history
Creation and debut (2009—2012)
In 2009, for fun, Frédéric Molas and Sébastien Rassiat decided to create a series of tests of old video games on the same concept as The Angry Video Game Nerd by James Rolfe, which is very successful. Recognizing that their first two videos were on the verge of plagiarism, Frédéric Molas nevertheless underlines that they then find their own identity, in particular with the character of the Player of the Attic. During a Twitch livestream from November 2020, where he revisited his old videos, Frédéric Molas explained that the show was originally called Big Review, a nod to the 1977 song "Big Bisou" by the singer Jean-Chrysostome Dolto, known as Carlos. Moreover, the Hawaiian shirt would also refer to the one worn by the singer. In this same livestream, he indicates that their respective roles were absolutely not defined.

In June 2012, a DVD of the show was sold with a special issue of the magazine Kultur Pop, containing the first ten episodes, an interview, commented episodes and a new episode. In September 2012, Frédéric Molas and Sébastien Rassiat left Perpignan and moved to Fougères to be closer to Paris. They thus founded an economic interest group with the Nesblog team in order to hire a sound engineer, Nico.

Departure to Fougères and follow-up (2012—2018)

A series of comics produced by the cartoonist Piratesourcil is published from October 2012. It relates the youth of Frédéric Molas before becoming the Player of the Attic, who is already a fan of video games. The first volume was released on October 25, 2012 and published by Hugo et compagnie, the second on September 19, 2013, and the third on September 4, 2014.

Between 2013 and 2014, new members were added to the team and appeared as extras: "Shun Geek" (Aurora) and "Sorina Chan", respectively in charge of costumes and illustrations. Karim Debbache works on writing and directing the episodes; the latter left the team in 2016 to devote himself to his own show, Chroma, then returned to it in 2019. It was also in 2019 that a fifth member joined the team as production manager, The SadPanda.

The publishing house Omaké Books and Joueur du Grenier'' are teaming up to release the episodes in the form of a fan book containing, in addition to the series of tests, commented episodes, bonus videos as well as an interview with the two protagonists. The first volume was released on July 8, 2015, the second on November 16, 2015, the third on June 16, 2016, the fourth on May 10, 2017, and the fifth on July 4, 2019.

Tenth anniversary (2019—present)

In 2019, to celebrate the tenth anniversary of the show, the writing of a special episode is launched. But following a postponement of the shooting and other delays, it begins on August 3, 2020 and takes place throughout Ille-et-Vilaine and Orne before ending in Paris on August 22, and the anniversary episode becomes the 11-year-old episode. The production and direction of the episode involved 25 people in the technical team, four actors and a hundred extras. The total production's cost of the episode was above 115,000 €.

Non-show filmography 
Thanks to their success on YouTube, the duo have managed to participate on other medias outside of their own content, and even dubbing characters since 2014.

Frédéric Molas

Sébastien Rassiat

See also
 Angry Video Game Nerd

References

External links
 
 

Comedy web series
Video game news websites
Viral videos
Video game podcasts
Gaming-related YouTube channels
Black comedy
Video game critics
French YouTubers
2009 web series debuts
2010s YouTube series
2020s YouTube series
YouTube channels launched in 2009
French web series